Granville George Leveson-Gower, 3rd Earl Granville  (4 March 1872 – 21 July 1939) was a British diplomat from the Leveson-Gower family who was an envoy to several countries.

Career
The elder son of the 2nd Earl Granville, Leveson-Gower was educated at Eton College and joined the Diplomatic Service in 1893 as an attaché in Berlin. He served in Cairo, Vienna, The Hague and Brussels, then was appointed back to Berlin with the rank of Counsellor in 1911. In 1913 he was appointed to Paris, again as counsellor, and moved to Bordeaux when the French government relocated there in September 1914 as the German army approached the capital before the First Battle of the Marne.

On 1 January 1917 he was appointed Diplomatic Agent to the Greek provisional government of Eleftherios Venizelos in Salonika, shortly afterwards formalised as Minister Plenipotentiary.

In June 1917, King Constantine abdicated, the previous British Minister to the Greek Government, Sir Francis Elliot, departed and Granville became official Minister to Greece in Athens. He was Minister to Denmark 1921–26, Minister to the Netherlands 1926–28 and Ambassador to Belgium and Luxembourg 1928–33.

As a Privy Counsellor, Earl Granville took part in the official procedures legalising the  accession of King Edward VIII in 1936 and, later that year, his abdication and the accession of King George VI.

Honours
Earl Granville was appointed MVO in 1904, raised to CVO in 1913 on the occasion of King George V's visit to Berlin, and knighted GCVO in the King's Birthday Honours of 1914. He was given the additional, senior knighthood of KCMG in the New Year Honours of 1924 and raised to GCMG in 1932. He was made a Privy Counsellor in 1928.

Orders 
The Earl received several awards and orders from European foreign dignitaries.
The King of Belgium awarded him the Order of Leopold.
 Awarded Order of the Dannebrog from Denmark.
 Awarded Order of the Polar Star from Sweden.
 Awarded Order of the Immaculate Conception of Vila Viçosa from Portugal.
 Awarded Order of the Crown (Prussia).

He had also been a Lord-in-waiting to Queen Victoria in 1895, to King Edward VII from 1905–10 and to King George V from 1910–15.

Family
On 27 September 1900, he married Nina Ayesha Baring (daughter of the diplomat Walter Baring, and son of Sir Francis Baring, 1st Baronet) but, in 1939, died without issue and his titles passed to his brother William.

References
GRANVILLE, 3rd Earl, Who Was Who, A & C Black, 1920–2008; online edn, Oxford University Press, Dec 2007
Lord Granville (obituary), The Times, London, 22 July 1939, page 14

External links

1872 births
1939 deaths
Leveson-Gower family
People educated at Eton College
Earls Granville
Diplomatic peers
Knights Grand Cross of the Order of St Michael and St George
Knights Grand Cross of the Royal Victorian Order
Liberal Party (UK) Lords-in-Waiting
Members of the Privy Council of the United Kingdom
Ambassadors of the United Kingdom to Greece
Ambassadors of the United Kingdom to Denmark
Ambassadors of the United Kingdom to the Netherlands
Ambassadors of the United Kingdom to Belgium
Ambassadors of the United Kingdom to Luxembourg